Asjad Raza Khan, a descendant of Ahmed Raza Khan Barelvi, is an Indian Muslim cleric and son of former Grand Mufti of India, Akhtar Raza Khan. He is the president of Jama'at Raza-e-Mustafa.

Statements and views

Extreme ideologies must be repelled 
After the bombings in Sri Lanka in 2019, Asjad Raza issued a strongly worded statement condemning the attacks and urging all nations to "repel the evil" and combat terrorist ideologies.

Demanding a ban on Zakir Naik 
Upon Zakir Naik being named as one of the influencers of the bombers in a terrorist attack in Bangladesh, Asjad said:

“India is the land of Sufism. Dr Naik speaks the language of terrorism. His thoughts are not Islamic, but related to (fundamentalist) Wahhabism. Back in 2008, we had demanded that the central and state governments to impose a ban on his speeches and programmes. Sufi Barelvis are united against him."

Asjad Raza also appealed to Muslim youth to refrain from listening to his speeches.

Refusal to recite the National Song 
Asjad Raza opposed the forced singing of the Vande Mataram song on Indian Independence Day at minority run educational institutions due to it being "un-Islamic", despite being ordered to by the Uttar Pradesh government.

References 

Indian people of Pashtun descent
Barelvis
Living people
Indian Sunni Muslim scholars of Islam
Ahmed Raza Khan family
1970 births